The Bougainville House of Representatives is the legislature of the Autonomous Region of Bougainville, an autonomous entity within Papua New Guinea. It was established in 2005 under Part 5 of the region's constitution, which specifies that the House of Representatives shall comprise 39 elected members in addition to the President of the Autonomous Region of Bougainville, and the Speaker of the House, chosen outside of it.

Structure
All elected members are chosen via Instant-runoff voting. Each of the 33 constituencies defined under Part 8 of the Constitution elects a single member to the House. Additionally, the North Bougainville District, South Bougainville District and Central Bougainville District each elect a woman representative and a former combatant representative who fought with the Bougainville Revolutionary Army during Bougainville's armed struggle for independence from Papua New Guinea. A 41st representative, the Speaker, is appointed externally by the elected members.

Representatives of Bougainville who have been elected to the National Parliament of Papua New Guinea are allowed many of the same privileges as members of the Bougainville House of Representatives; but they may not: introduce motions, vote, or be counted towards a quorum. However, they are allowed to attend meetings of the House where they take part in debates and other proceedings.

Speakers
The Speaker is not an elected member of the House of Representatives, and is elected by a vote by the members.

Members

 Members of the Bougainville House of Representatives, 2010–2015
 Members of the Bougainville House of Representatives, 2015–2020
 Members of the Bougainville House of Representatives, 2020–2025

References

External links
Bougainville House of Representatives

 
Autonomous Region of Bougainville
Government of the Autonomous Region of Bougainville
Politics of Papua New Guinea
Political organisations based in Papua New Guinea
Legislatures of country subdivisions
Unicameral legislatures